Mézières-lez-Cléry (literally Mézières near Cléry) is a commune in the Loiret department in north-central France.

See also
Communes of the Loiret department

References

Meziereslezclery